This article provides details of international football games played by the Singapore national football team from 1990 to 1999.

Results

1990

1991

1992

1993

1995

1996

1997

1998

1999 

Notes

References

Football in Singapore
Results 1990
1990s in Singaporean sport